A crack growth equation is used for calculating the size of a fatigue crack growing from cyclic loads. The growth of fatigue cracks can result in catastrophic failure, particularly in the case of aircraft. A crack growth equation can be used to ensure safety, both in the design phase and during operation, by predicting the size of cracks. In critical structure, loads can be recorded and used to predict the size of cracks to ensure maintenance or retirement occurs prior to any of the cracks failing.

Fatigue life can be divided into an initiation period and a crack growth period. Crack growth equations are used to predict the crack size starting from a given initial flaw and are typically based on experimental data obtained from constant amplitude fatigue tests.

One of the earliest crack growth equations based on the stress intensity factor range of a load cycle is the Paris–Erdogan equation

        
A variety of crack growth equations similar to the Paris–Erdogan equation have been developed to include factors that affect the crack growth rate such as stress ratio, overloads and load history effects.

The stress intensity range can be calculated from the maximum and minimum stress intensity for a cycle

A geometry factor  is used to relate the far field stress  to the crack tip stress intensity using
.

There are standard references containing the geometry factors for many different configurations.

History of crack propagation equations 

Many crack propagation equations have been proposed over the years to improve prediction accuracy and incorporate a variety of effects. The works of Head, Frost and Dugdale, McEvily and Illg, and Liu on fatigue crack-growth behaviour laid the foundation in this topic. The general form of these crack propagation equations may be expressed as

Crack growth equations of the form  are not a true differential equation as they do not model the process of crack growth in a continuous manner throughout the loading cycle. As such, separate cycle counting or identification algorithms such as the commonly used rainflow-counting algorithm, are required to identify the maximum and minimum values in a cycle. Although developed for the stress/strain-life methods rainflow counting has also been shown to work for crack growth. There have been a small number of true derivative fatigue crack growth equations that have also been developed.

Factors affecting crack growth rate

Regimes 
Figure 1 shows a typical plot of the rate of crack growth as a function of the alternating stress intensity or crack tip driving force  plotted on log scales. The crack growth rate behaviour with respect to the alternating stress intensity can be explained in different regimes (see, figure 1) as follows

Regime A: At low growth rates, variations in microstructure, mean stress (or load ratio), and environment have significant effects on the crack propagation rates. It is observed at low load ratios that the growth rate is most sensitive to microstructure and in low strength materials it is most sensitive to load ratio.

Regime B: At mid-range of growth rates, variations in microstructure, mean stress (or load ratio), thickness, and environment have no significant effects on the crack propagation rates.

Regime C: At high growth rates, crack propagation is highly sensitive to the variations in microstructure, mean stress (or load ratio), and thickness. Environmental effects have relatively very less influence.

Stress ratio effect 

Cycles with higher stress ratio  have an increased rate of crack growth. This effect is often explained using the crack closure concept which describes the observation that the crack faces can remain in contact with each other at loads above zero. This reduces the effective stress intensity factor range and the fatigue crack growth rate.

Sequence effects 
A  equation gives the rate of growth for a single cycle, but when the loading is not constant amplitude, changes in the loading can lead to temporary increases or decreases in the rate of growth. Additional equations have been developed to deal with some of these cases. The rate of growth is retarded when an overload occurs in a loading sequence. These loads generate are plastic zone that may delay the rate of growth. Two notable equations for modelling the delays occurring while the crack grows through the overload region are:

 The Wheeler model (1972)
 with 

 The Willenborg model

Crack growth equations

Threshold equation 
To predict the crack growth rate at the near threshold region, the following relation has been used

Paris–Erdoğan equation 
To predict the crack growth rate in the intermediate regime, the Paris–Erdoğan equation is used

Forman equation 
In 1967, Forman proposed the following relation to account for the increased growth rates due to stress ratio and when approaching the fracture toughness

McEvily–Groeger equation 
McEvily and Groeger proposed the following power-law relationship which considers the effects of both high and low values of 

.

NASGRO equation 
The NASGRO equation is used in the crack growth programs AFGROW, FASTRAN and NASGRO software. It is a general equation that covers the lower growth rate near the threshold  and the increased growth rate approaching the fracture toughness , as well as allowing for the mean stress effect by including the stress ratio . The NASGRO equation is

McClintock equation 
In 1967, McClintock developed an equation for the upper limit of crack growth based on the cyclic crack tip opening displacement 

Walker equation 
To account for the stress ratio effect, Walker suggested a modified form of the Paris–Erdogan equation

where,  is a material parameter which represents the influence of stress ratio on the fatigue crack growth rate. In general, it is assumed that compressive portion of the loading cycle  has no effect on the crack growth by considering  which gives  This can be physically explained by considering that the crack closes at zero load and does not behave like a crack under compressive loads.

Elber equation 
Elber modified the Paris–Erdogan equation to allow for crack closure with the introduction of the opening stress intensity level  at which contact occurs. Below this level there is no movement at the crack tip and hence no growth. This effect has been used to explain the stress ratio effect and the increased rate of growth observed with short cracks. Elber's equation is

Ductile and brittle materials equation 
The general form of the fatigue-crack growth rate in ductile and brittle materials is given by

Prediction of fatigue life

Computer programs 

There are many computer programs that implement crack growth equations such as Nasgro, AFGROW and Fastran. In addition, there are also programs that implement a probabilistic approach to crack growth that calculate the probability of failure throughout the life of a component.

Crack growth programs grow a crack from an initial flaw size until it exceeds the fracture toughness of a material and fails. Because the fracture toughness depends on the boundary conditions, the fracture toughness may change from plane strain conditions for a semi-circular surface crack to plane stress conditions for a through crack. The fracture toughness for plane stress conditions is typically twice as large as that for plane strain. However, because of the rapid rate of growth of a crack near the end of its life, variations in fracture toughness do not significantly alter the life of a component.

Crack growth programs typically provide a choice of:
 cycle counting methods to extract cycle extremes
 geometry factors that select for the shape of the crack and the applied loading
 crack growth equation
 acceleration/retardation models
 material properties such as yield strength and fracture toughness

Analytical solution 
The stress intensity factor is given by

The alternating stress intensity becomes

where  is the range of the cyclic stress amplitude.

By assuming the initial crack size to be , the critical crack size  before the specimen fails can be computed using  as

Case I 
For  crack closure has negligible effect on the crack growth rate and the Paris–Erdogan equation can be used to compute the fatigue life of a specimen before it reaches the critical crack size  as

Crack growth model with constant value of 𝛽 and R = 0 

For the Griffith-Irwin crack growth model or center crack of length  in an infinite sheet as shown in the figure 2, we have  and is independent of the crack length. Also,   can be considered to be independent of the crack length. By assuming  the above integral simplifies to

The above analytical expressions for the total number of load cycles to fracture  are obtained by assuming . For the cases, where  is dependent on the crack size such as the Single Edge Notch Tension (SENT), Center Cracked Tension (CCT) geometries, numerical integration can be used to compute .

Case II 
For  crack closure phenomenon has an effect on the crack growth rate and we can invoke Walker equation to compute the fatigue life of a specimen before it reaches the critical crack size  as

Numerical calculation 

This scheme is useful when  is dependent on the crack size . The initial crack size is considered to be . The stress intensity factor at the current crack size  is computed using the maximum applied stress as

If  is less than the fracture toughness , the crack has not reached its critical size  and the simulation is continued with the current crack size to calculate the alternating stress intensity as

Now, by substituting the stress intensity factor in Paris–Erdogan equation, the increment in the crack size  is computed as

where  is cycle step size. The new crack size becomes

where index  refers to the current iteration step. The new crack size is used to calculate the stress intensity at maximum applied stress for the next iteration. This iterative process is continued until

Once this failure criterion is met, the simulation is stopped.

The schematic representation of the fatigue life prediction process is shown in figure 3.

Example 

The stress intensity factor in a SENT specimen (see, figure 4) under fatigue crack growth is given by

The following parameters are considered for the calculation

 mm,  mm,  mm, 
MPa,, .

The critical crack length, can be computed when  as

Now, invoking the Paris–Erdogan equation gives

References

External links 
 
 
 

Materials science
Fracture mechanics
Mechanical failure
Mechanical failure modes
Solid mechanics
Structural analysis